Tim Monsion is an American television and film actor.

He has had minor roles in several TV shows such as Desperate Housewives, Frasier, Numb3rs, 7th Heaven, The King of Queens and Mad About You. He has also appeared in films such as Men of Honor and Blink.

References

External links
 

Year of birth missing (living people)
Living people
American male film actors
American male television actors